Itapirapuã Paulista is a municipality in the state of São Paulo in Brazil. The population is 4,268 (2020 est.) in an area of 406 km². The elevation is 589 m.

References

Municipalities in São Paulo (state)